Sorcha-Lucy Eastwood (born October 1985) is an Alliance Party politician who was elected to the Northern Ireland Assembly from Lagan Valley in the 2022 Assembly election.

Political career

Early career (2017–2022) 
Sorcha Eastwood ran in the 2017 Northern Ireland Assembly election as an Alliance Party candidate in Belfast West. She received 747 first preference votes and was eliminated on the first count.

She was an Alliance candidate again later that year, this time for the 2017 general election, running in Belfast West. She came 5th, with 731 votes, roughly maintaining Alliance's percentage share of the vote from the previous general election.

She was elected in May 2019 as a councilor on Lisburn and Castlereagh City Council, representing the constituency of Castlereagh South. In that election, she topped the poll with 1,629 first preference votes and was elected on the first count.

Later that year, she was the Alliance Party candidate for Lagan Valley in the 2019 UK general election, polling 28.8% of the vote (an increase of 17.7%), coming second behind the DUP incumbent Jeffrey Donaldson, while reducing his majority from 19,229 to 6,499.

Member of the Legislative Assembly (2022–present) 
Sorcha Eastwood, alongside David Honeyford, was an Alliance candidate for the 2022 Assembly election in Lagan Valley. She polled 8,211 first preference votes and was elected on the fourth count. She took the seat formerly held by Alliance Party turned Independent MLA Trevor Lunn, who did not run for re-election.

Personal life
On 8 June 2017, Eastwood married her husband Dale Shirlow in Lisburn. With her wedding on the same day as the 2017 UK general election, Eastwood cast an election ballot for herself in her wedding dress.

References 

Living people
Alliance Party of Northern Ireland MLAs
Female members of the Northern Ireland Assembly
Northern Ireland MLAs 2022–2027
Alliance Party parliamentary candidates
21st-century women politicians from Northern Ireland
1985 births